Peter Harding (born 4 February 1969)  is an Australian Paralympic wheelchair rugby player. He was born in Mildura, Victoria. He won a silver medal at the 2000 Sydney Games with the Australian Steelers.

References

External links
 

1969 births
Living people
Paralympic wheelchair rugby players of Australia
Paralympic silver medalists for Australia
Paralympic medalists in wheelchair rugby
Wheelchair rugby players at the 2000 Summer Paralympics
Medalists at the 2000 Summer Paralympics